The 2005 National Invitation Tournament was the 2005 edition of the annual NCAA college basketball competition. South Carolina defeated Saint Joseph's, 60-57, to earn the program's first NIT title.

Selected teams
Below is a list of the 40 teams selected for the tournament.

Bracket
Below are the four first round brackets, along with the four-team championship bracket.

Semifinals & finals

See also
 2005 Women's National Invitation Tournament
 2005 NCAA Division I men's basketball tournament
 2005 NCAA Division II men's basketball tournament
 2005 NCAA Division III men's basketball tournament
 2005 NCAA Division I women's basketball tournament
 2005 NCAA Division II women's basketball tournament
 2005 NCAA Division III women's basketball tournament
 2005 NAIA Division I men's basketball tournament
 2005 NAIA Division II men's basketball tournament
 2005 NAIA Division I women's basketball tournament
 2005 NAIA Division II women's basketball tournament

References

National Invitation
National Invitation Tournament
2000s in Manhattan
Basketball competitions in New York City
College sports in New York City
Madison Square Garden
National Invitation Tournament
National Invitation Tournament
Sports in Manhattan